Human Croquet is the second novel of Kate Atkinson. The book covers the experiences of Isobel Fairfax, including her occasional bouts of time-travelling, while setting out the legacy of a 300-year-old family curse.

Reception 
In a review of Atkinson's later novel Life After Life (2013), Sam Sacks of The Wall Street Journal stated that Human Croquet was "indifferently received".

References

External links 
 

1997 British novels
Novels by Kate Atkinson
Family saga novels
British magic realism novels
Doubleday (publisher) books